Paraliburnia kilmani is a species of delphacid planthopper in the family Delphacidae. It is found in North America.

References

Articles created by Qbugbot
Insects described in 1897
Delphacinae